During the 1999–2000 Dutch football season, AFC Ajax competed in the Eredivisie.

Season summary
Another poor season saw Ajax finish in 5th, though this at least was an improvement on finishing sixth the previous season.

Players

First-team squad
Squad at end of season. Squad numbers refer to numbers worn in European competitions.

Left club during season

Jong Ajax

Transfers

Out
 Danny Blind - retired
 Gerald Sibon - Sheffield Wednesday, £2,000,000
 Kofi Mensah - NAC Breda
 Dean Gorré - Huddersfield Town
 Mario Melchiot - Chelsea, free
 Andrzej Rudy - Lierse
 Sunday Oliseh - Juventus
 Jari Litmanen - Barcelona

Results

UEFA Cup

Second round

Ajax won 3–1 on aggregate.

Third round

Mallorca won 3–0 on aggregate.

References

Notes

AFC Ajax seasons
AFC Ajax